San José de la Montaña is a town and municipality in the Colombian department of Antioquia. Part of the subregion of Northern Antioquia.

Municipalities of Antioquia Department